Lepidodactylus lugubris, known as the mourning gecko or common smooth-scaled gecko, is a species of lizard, a gecko of the family Gekkonidae.

Description 
Lepidodactylus lugubris measure 8.5-10 cm in length including tail (4-4.4 cm snout-to-vent). L. lugubris is cryptically coloured, typically light to dark tan with dark spots down the length of its back and a brown strip from the ear to the tip of the nose. This species is capable of changing color, and so the same individual may appear light or dark at different times during the day.

Behavior and ecology 
L. lugubris is primarily nocturnal, but is occasionally encountered exposed but near cover during the day.

This species is nearly all female, and reproduces via parthenogenesis. While males occasionally occur, they are very rare and often sterile. Females lay 1-2 eggs at a time, and glue them to surfaces in protected locations.  Clutches are laid every 4-6 weeks.

Distribution

This species is widespread in coastal regions of the Indian and Pacific oceans, including the Maldives, Sri Lanka, India, Myanmar, Malaysia, Hawai'i, Vietnam, Thailand, Cambodia, Japan, Taiwan, China, Indonesia, Singapore, Philippines, Papua New Guinea, Fiji, Australia (Cocos Island), Western Samoa, Guam, the Society Islands, Pitcairn, and the Mascarene Islands.

It has been introduced widely in the Neotropics, including in Mexico, Brazil, Guatemala, Honduras, El Salvador, Nicaragua, Costa Rica, Panama, Ecuador (including the Galapagos), Colombia and Chile, as well as to the Seychelles in the Indian Ocean.

Diet 
L. lugubris are omnivorous. In the wild, they eat a varied diet of insects, spiders, amphipods, pill bugs, fruit, nectar, pollen, and even their own eggs. They will also feed on jam, sugar, sweetened drinks, and milk, if given the opportunity.

Captivity 
L. lugubris are occasionally kept as pets due to their simple care requirements and social nature. Because they are parthenogenic, these geckos reproduce well in captivity and thus most individuals kept as pets are captive-bred.

References

 
 
 
 
 
 Henderson, R. W., VILLA, J., & DIXON, J. R. 1976 Lepidodactylus lugubris (Reptilia: Gekkonidae). A recent addition to the herpetofauna of Nicaragua. Herpetol. Rev. 7:173.
 Jarecki, L. & Lazell, J.D. 1987 Zur Grösse und Dichte einer Population von Lepidodactylus lugubris (Duméril & Bibron 1836) in Aiea, Hawaii (Sauria: Gekkonidae). Salamandra 23 (2/3): 176-178
 Kikukawa, Akira 1999 Geographic distribution. Lepidodactylus lugubris Herpetological Review 30 (1): 52
 Mau, K.-G. 1978 Nachweis natürlicher Parthenogenese bei Lepidodactylus lugubris durch Gefangenschaftsnachzucht (Reptilia: Sauria: Gekkonidae). Salamandra 14 (2): 90-97
 Pasteur, G.;Agnese, J.-F.;Blanc, C. P.;Pastuer, N. 1987 Polyclony and low relative heterozygosity in a widespread unisexual vertebrate, Lepidodactylus lugubris (Sauria) Genetica 75: 71-79
 Röll, B. 2002 Lepidodactylus lugubris (Duméril & Bibron). Sauria (Suppl.) 24 (3): 545-550
 Rösler, Herbert 1992 Beobachtungen an drei Männchen des parthenogenetischen Geckos Lepidodactylus lugubris (Duméril & Bibron 1836). Sauria 14 (3): 25-26
 Sengoku, Showichi 1998 Geographic Distribution. Lepidodactylus lugubris Herpetological Review 29 (2): 110
 Turner, Grant;Green, Darren 1996 Notes on the mourning gecko Lepidodactylus lugubris in the Daintree region Herpetofauna (Sydney) 26 (1): 5-7
 Villa, Jaime D. 1993 Lepidodactylus lugubris (mourning gecko). Nicaragua: Zelaya Herpetological Review 24 (3): 109
 Yamashiro, Saiko;Ota, Hidetoshi 1998 Discovery of a male phenotype of the Parthenogenetic gecko, Lepidodactylus lugubris, on Ishigakijima Island of the Yaeyama Group, Ryūkyū Archipelago Japanese Journal of Herpetology 17 (4): 152-155
 Guerreiro, Manuel.;Graterol, Gabriel.; 2012 PRIMER REGISTRO DE LEPIDODACTYLUS LUGUBRIS DUMÉRIL & BIBRON, 1836 (REPTILIA: GEKKONIDAE) PARA VENEZUELA herpetotropicos; 6(12):15-16.

External links
 
 

Geckos
Vertebrate parthenogenesis
Reptiles of Myanmar
Geckos of Australia
Reptiles of China
Reptiles of India
Reptiles of Indonesia
Reptiles of Japan
Reptiles of Malaysia
Reptiles of the Philippines
Reptiles of Sri Lanka
Reptiles of Taiwan
Reptiles of Vietnam
Reptiles described in 1836
Taxa named by André Marie Constant Duméril
Taxa named by Gabriel Bibron
Fauna of the Cook Islands
Reptiles of Borneo
Reptiles of Hawaii